Bugs Bunny's Easter Special (also known as The Bugs Bunny Easter Special and Bugs Bunny's Easter Funnies) is a 1977 Easter-themed Looney Tunes television special directed by Friz Freleng and features clips from 10 Warner Bros. cartoons. It originally aired on the CBS network April 7, 1977.

Plot 
The Easter Bunny is ill, and Granny needs to find a replacement for him. She suggests Bugs Bunny as the needed replacement. When she reaches the Warner Bros. lot, she finds to her disappointment that Bugs is tied up in filming Knighty Knight Bugs but offers to work out a solution after filming wraps up. Meanwhile, Daffy Duck, partially overhearing the conversation, eagerly offers Granny his services, but always dresses up in the wrong Easter-related outfit (such as an Easter egg or an Easter basket). Still tied up after filming two more shorts, Bugs decides to suggest other Looney Tunes stars, who are likewise unable or unsuited.

In the end, Bugs offers to serve as the bunny's replacement if the work can be delayed until a week after Easter; Granny considers this unacceptable, but the Easter Bunny, apparently well, arrives, and thus Bugs's services are no longer needed. In the end, the supposed Easter Bunny reveals himself to be Daffy in an Easter bunny suit (finally getting it right), which neither surprises nor disappoints Bugs or Granny, having known all along it was Daffy.

Cast 
 Mel Blanc as Bugs Bunny, Daffy Duck/the Easter Bunny, Porky Pig, Tweety, Sylvester, Pepé Le Pew, Yosemite Sam, and Foghorn Leghorn,
 June Foray as Granny

Featured cartoons 
 Knighty Knight Bugs (Friz Freleng; August 23, 1958)
 Hillbilly Hare (Robert McKimson; August 12, 1950)
 Bully For Bugs (Chuck Jones; August 8, 1953)
 Tweety's Circus (Friz Freleng; June 4, 1955)
 Birds Anonymous (Friz Freleng; August 10, 1957)
 For Scent-imental Reasons (Chuck Jones; November 12, 1949)
 Rabbit of Seville (Chuck Jones; December 16, 1950)
 Little Boy Boo (Robert McKimson; June 5, 1954)
 Robin Hood Daffy (Chuck Jones; March 8, 1958)
 Sahara Hare (Friz Freleng; March 26, 1955)

Home media 
This special was released on DVD on February 16, 2010.

References

External links
 

1977 television specials
1970s American television specials
1970s animated television specials
1977 in American television
CBS television specials
Looney Tunes television specials
CBS original programming
Easter television specials
Television specials by DePatie–Freleng Enterprises
Films scored by Milt Franklyn
Bugs Bunny films
Daffy Duck films
Porky Pig films
Easter Bunny in television